Parsbit, also known as Prisbit, was a Khazar noblewoman active in the 730s CE. In Armenian sources (Lewond), Parsbit is called "the mother of the khagan".

Whether she was the regent for an infant monarch (unlikely, since during the same period Barjik is called "the son of the khagan") or for an incompetent one (again unlikely, since the Khazars during this period practiced ritual regicide once a monarch's ability to rule was compromised), or whether she ruled in her own right is unclear. What is certain is that Parsbit (called Barsbek in some sources) wielded an enormous degree of power, even commanding armies (such as the expeditionary force led against Armenia by Tar'mach in 730).

Sources
Golden, Peter B. Khazar Studies: An Historio-Philological Inquiry into the Origins of the Khazars. Budapest: Akadémiai Kiadó, 1980.

Khazar rulers
8th-century women rulers
Year of birth unknown
Year of death unknown
Women in war in Western Asia
Women in medieval European warfare
Women in medieval warfare